Guajén is a small community in Camajuaní, Cuba. It splits into Guajén Camajuaní (on the Camajuani River) and Guía Guajén.

Government 
Camajuaní has multiple Constituency Delegate (Delegado Circunscripción) for every community, Guajén has:

 Constituency Delegate #40 Lázaro González Marrero

Geography 
Guajén is a part of the ward of Aguada de Moya.

History 
Guajén used to be a part of the former Municipality of Vueltas.

Economy 
According at the DMPF of Camajuani, Guajén is a settlement not linked to any source of an economic or job development.

Infrastructure 
In Guajén there is the path of Guajén (Camino de Guajén) though the Camajuaní River and heads to Vega Alta and Paso Real.

References 

Populated places in Villa Clara Province